Tokyo Korean Middle and High School (東京朝鮮中高級学校 Tōkyō Chōsen Chūkōkyūgakkō; Korean:  Hanja) is a Korean international school in  (十条台), Kita-ku, Tokyo.

History

Historically the school received funding of a six million yen ($63,000 US in 2013) subsidy every year from the Japanese government. Around 2011 the Japanese government made Korean heritage schools ineligible for tuition waivers. In 2013 the Japanese government announced that this school would no longer get subsidies.

Operations

The school uses the Korean language throughout the entire school activities with the exception of Japanese and English classes for the purpose of disseminating cultural heritage. Female students and teachers wear chima jeogori. The school serves Korean foods in its cafeteria. As of 2013 80% of the school's costs come from tuition and other expenses from the parents of the students.

Student body
As of 2013 the school had 650 students. As of 2014 about 40% of the students who graduate from this school attend universities. The school's peak enrollment was in the late 1960s, with 2,300 students.

References

Further reading
 Torres, Ida. "Caught between two worlds: A North Korean school in Japan." Japan Daily Press. February 4, 2013.
  "東京朝鮮中高級学校 (作品と方法(1960-1975))." 建築 (176), p86-89, 1975-07. 中外出版. See profile at CiNii.

External links

  Tokyo Korean Junior and Senior High School

International schools in Tokyo
North Korean schools in Japan
High schools in Tokyo
Kita, Tokyo